47 Aglaja  is a large, dark main belt asteroid. It was discovered by Robert Luther on 15 September 1857 from Düsseldorf. The name was chosen by the Philosophical Faculty of the University of Bonn and refers to Aglaea, one of the Charites in Greek mythology. It was rendered Aglaia in English sources into the early 20th century, as 'i' and 'j' are equivalent in Latin names and in the Latin rendering of Greek names.

Based upon its spectrum, 47 Aglaja is listed as a C-type asteroid under the Tholen classification taxonomy, indicating a carbonaceous composition. The SMASS classification system rates it as a rare B-type asteroid. There is a broad absorption feature at 1 μm that is associated with the presence of magnetite and is what gives the asteroid its blue tint.

On 16 September 1984, the star SAO 146599 was occulted by 47 Aglaja. This event was observed from 13 sites in the continental United States, allowing a cross-sectional profile to be determined. Based upon this study, the asteroid has a diameter of 136.4 ± 1.2 km. The geometric albedo calculated at the time of the occultation was 0.071 ± 0.002.

2012 photometric observations of this asteroid at the Organ Mesa Observatory in Las Cruces, New Mexico gave a light curve with a period of 13.175 ± 0.002 hours and a brightness variation of 0.09 ± 0.01 in magnitude. This result is in agreement with previous studies.

References

External links 
 This is an image of Aglaja taken by the SDSS telescope on 13 October 1999 when it was 1.7 AU from Earth/Fermats Brother
 
 

Background asteroids
Aglaja
Aglaja
C-type asteroids (Tholen)
B-type asteroids (SMASS)
18570915